Denisa is a feminine given name, equivalent to English Denise, used in various European languages, particularly in Albanian, Croatian, Czech, Romanian, Slovak and Slovenian. Notable people with the name include:

Denisa Chládková
Denisa Dedu
Denisa Dvořáková
Denisa Golgotă
Denisa Křížová
Denisa Legac
Denisa Proto
Denisa Rosolová
Denisa Saková
Denisa Sokolovská
Denisa Smolenová
Denisa Spergerová
Denisa Tîlvescu
Denisa Vyšňovská
Denisa Wagner
 Jiří Procházka, a Czech martial artist known as Denisa or Deniska

See also
 Denise (given name)

Albanian feminine given names
Czech feminine given names
Croatian feminine given names
Romanian feminine given names
Slovak feminine given names
[[te iubesc denny esti o fata minunata<33   -franciiii]]